This article displays the rosters for the participating teams at the 2016 FIBA Africa Under-18 Championship.







DR Congo















References

External links
 Official Site

FIBA Africa Under-18 Championship squads